Michael Houlie (born 27 June 2000) is a South African swimmer. He competed in the men's 100 metre breaststroke at the 2019 World Aquatics Championships. In 2019, he represented South Africa at the 2019 African Games held in Rabat, Morocco. He also competed in the men's 100 metre breaststroke event at the 2020 Summer Olympics.

2022
Houlie achieved a 2022 World Aquatics Championships and 2022 Commonwealth Games qualifying time in the 50 metre breaststroke with a gold medal-winning time of 27.22 seconds at the 2022 South Africa National Swimming Championships. While his time did achieve the qualifying standard, he was not automatically qualified for the World Championships team as swimmers were required to qualify in Olympic events per the selection criteria. Upon completion of the Championships, Swimming South Africa named him as a qualifier for both the World Championships and the Commonwealth Games in the 50 metre breaststroke.

Day two of swimming at the 2022 Commonwealth Games, conducted in July and August in Birmingham, England, Houlie ranked twelfth in the preliminaries of the 100 metre breaststroke, qualifying for the semifinals with his time of 1:01.62. In the semifinals, he placed twelfth with a time of 1:01.24 and did not qualify for the event final. Two days later, he swam a time of 27.10 seconds in the preliminaries of the 50 metre breaststroke, tying Adam Peaty of England for overall first-rank and qualifying for the semifinals. He ranked third overall in the semifinals, second in his heat behind Sam Williamson of Australia, with a time of 27.39 seconds and qualified for the final. He finished 0.04 seconds behind bronze medalist Ross Murdoch of Scotland in the final, with a time of 27.36 seconds, to place fourth.

At the 2022 U.S. Open Swimming Championships, held in Greensboro, United States, Houlie competed representing the University of Tennessee and helped win a silver medal in the 4×100 metre medley relay on day two, splitting a 50.96 for the freestyle leg of the relay to contribute to the final time of 3:43.44. The following day, he placed fifth in the final of the 100 metre breaststroke with a time of 1:02.08.

References

External links
 

 

2000 births
Living people
South African male swimmers
Place of birth missing (living people)
Swimmers at the 2018 Summer Youth Olympics
Swimmers at the 2019 African Games
African Games medalists in swimming
African Games gold medalists for South Africa
African Games bronze medalists for South Africa
Commonwealth Games medallists in swimming
Commonwealth Games bronze medallists for South Africa
Swimmers at the 2018 Commonwealth Games
Swimmers at the 2022 Commonwealth Games
Youth Olympic gold medalists for South Africa
Swimmers at the 2020 Summer Olympics
Olympic swimmers of South Africa
Universiade medalists in swimming
Tennessee Volunteers men's swimmers
Sportspeople from Cape Town
21st-century South African people
Universiade silver medalists for South Africa
Medalists at the 2019 Summer Universiade
Medallists at the 2018 Commonwealth Games